The 81st New York State Legislature, consisting of the New York State Senate and the New York State Assembly, met from January 5 to April 19, 1858, during the second year of John A. King's governorship, in Albany.

Background
Under the provisions of the New York Constitution of 1846, 32 Senators and 128 assemblymen were elected in single-seat districts; senators for a two-year term, assemblymen for a one-year term. The senatorial districts were made up of entire counties, except New York County (four districts) and Kings County (two districts). The Assembly districts were made up of entire towns, or city wards, forming a contiguous area, all within the same county.

On April 13, the Legislature re-apportioned the Senate districts, and the Assembly seats per county. Cayuga, Dutchess, Genesee, Greene, Montgomery, Onondaga, Orange, Otsego, Schoharie and Tompkins counties lost one seat each; New York, Oswego, Queens, Ulster and Westchester counties gained one seat each; Kings County gained four seats; and the new Schuyler County was apportioned one seat.

At this time there were two major political parties: the Democratic Party and the Republican Party. The Know Nothing movement ran in the election as the "American Party."

Elections
The New York state election, 1857 was held on November 3. All eight statewide elective offices were carried by the Democrats. The approximate party strength at this election, as expressed by the vote for Secretary of State was: Democratic 195,000; Republican 177,000; and American 67,000.

Sessions
The Legislature met for the regular session at the Old State Capitol in Albany on January 5, 1858; and adjourned on April 19.

On January 12, John B. Halsted (R) was elected president pro tempore of the State Senate..

On January 26, after three weeks of deadlock, Thomas G. Alvord (D) was elected Speaker on the 53rd ballot.

State Senate

Districts

 1st District: Queens, Richmond and Suffolk counties
 2nd District: 1st, 2nd, 3rd, 4th, 5th, 7th, 11th, 13th and 19th wards of the City of Brooklyn
 3rd District: 6th, 8th, 9th, 10th, 12th, 14th, 15th, 16th, 17th and 18th wards of the City of Brookland; and all towns in Kings County
 4th District: 1st, 2nd, 3rd, 4th, 5th, 6th, 7th, 8th and 14th wards of New York City
 5th District: 10th, 11th, 13th and 17th wards of New York City
 6th District: 9th, 15th, 16th and 18th wards of New York City
 7th District: 12th, 19th, 20th, 21st and 22nd wards of New York City
 8th District: Putnam, Rockland and Westchester counties
 9th District: Orange and Sullivan counties
 10th District: Greene and Ulster counties
 11th District: Columbia and Dutchess counties
 12th District: Rensselaer and Washington counties
 13th District: Albany County 
 14th District: Delaware, Schenectady  and Schoharie counties
 15th District: Fulton, Hamilton, Montgomery and Saratoga counties
 16th District: Clinton, Essex and Warren counties
 17th District: Franklin and St. Lawrence counties
 18th District: Jefferson and Lewis counties
 19th District: Oneida County
 20th District: Herkimer and Otsego counties
 21st District: Oswego County
 22nd District: Onondaga County
 23rd District: Chenango, Cortland and Madison counties
 24th District: Broome, Tompkins and Tioga counties
 25th District: Cayuga and Wayne counties
 26th District: Ontario, Seneca and Yates counties
 27th District: Chemung, Schuyler and Steuben counties
 28th District: Monroe County
 29th District: Genesee, Niagara and Orleans counties
 30th District: Allegany, Livingston and Wyoming counties
 31st District: Erie County
 32nd District: Cattaraugus and Chautauqua counties

Note: There are now 62 counties in the State of New York. The counties which are not mentioned in this list had not yet been established, or sufficiently organized, the area being included in one or more of the abovementioned counties.

Members
The asterisk (*) denotes members of the previous Legislature who continued in office as members of this Legislature. James Noxon, John E. Paterson, John B. Halsted, James Wadsworth and John P. Darling were re-elected. George G. Scott and Ralph A. Loveland changed from the Assembly to the Senate.

Party affiliations follow the vote for Senate officers.

Employees
 Clerk: Samuel P. Allen
 Deputy Clerk: Henry J. Sickles
 Sergeant-at-Arms: Henry W. Dwight
 Assistant Sergeant-at-Arms: Simeon Dillingham
 Doorkeeper: Richard U. Owens
 First Assistant Doorkeeper: Henry W. Shipman
 Second Assistant Doorkeeper: Samuel Ten Eyck
 Third Assistant Doorkeeper: James P. Clark
 Journal Clerk: James Terwilliger
 Engrossing Clerks: A. N. Cole, Charles G. Fairman

State Assembly

Assemblymen
The asterisk (*) denotes members of the previous Legislature who continued as members of this Legislature.

Party affiliations follow the original vote for Speaker.

Employees
 Clerk: David Wilson
 Assistant Clerk: Edwin O. Perrin
 Sergeant-at-Arms: Philip H. Lasher
 Doorkeeper: Peter J. Cook
 First Assistant Doorkeeper: John Davis
 Second Assistant Doorkeeper: James Swarthout
 Journal Clerk: Joseph B. Cushman

Notes

Sources
 The New York Civil List compiled by Franklin Benjamin Hough, Stephen C. Hutchins and Edgar Albert Werner (1867; see pg. 439 for Senate districts; pg. 442 for senators; pg. 450–462 for Assembly districts; and pg. 485ff for assemblymen)
 Journal of the Senate (81st Session) (1858)
 Journal of the Assembly (81st Session) (1858)
 Biographical Sketches of the State Officers and Members of the Legislature of the State of New York in 1858 by William D. Murphy
 The Evening Journal Almanac (Senate and Assembly members with party affiliations and election endorsements, pg. 21–35)

081
1858 in New York (state)
1858 U.S. legislative sessions